"Illuminated" is a song by the British musical duo Hurts from their first album, Happiness and was co-written with The Nexus. Initially charting on the UK Singles Chart at number 68 in September 2010 after a feature on Sky1's Unmissable Dramas promo, the track was released as a double A-side with "Better Than Love" as the fifth single from the album.

Track listing
Digital EP
"Better Than Love" - 3:30
"Better Than Love" (Freemasons Pegasus Mix Radio Edit) – 3:36
"Better Than Love" (Death in Vegas Acid Remix)
"Better Than Love" (Burns European Sex Remix) – 5:07
"Illuminated" – 3:19

Charts

References

2011 singles
Hurts songs
Synth-pop ballads